Brigitte Liso (born 29 July 1959) is a French entrepreneur and politician of La République En Marche! (LREM) who has been serving as a member of the French National Assembly since the 2017 elections, representing the department of Nord.

Early career
Liso spent her early career in the private sector as a public and commercial relations manager for major groups such as Pernod Ricard and Hachette Livre, then as a medical sales representative for GlaxoSmithKline. She later founded a patisserie business specializing on éclairs.

Political career
In parliament, Liso served on the Committee on Cultural Affairs and Education from 2017 until 2019 before moving to the Committee on Foreign Affairs. In addition to her committee assignments, she is part of the French-Italian Parliamentary Friendship Group.

In July 2019, Liso voted in favor of the French ratification of the European Union’s Comprehensive Economic and Trade Agreement (CETA) with Canada.

See also
 2017 French legislative election

References

1959 births
Living people
Deputies of the 15th National Assembly of the French Fifth Republic
La République En Marche! politicians
21st-century French women politicians
Politicians from Lille
Women members of the National Assembly (France)
Members of Parliament for Nord